Nadège Noële Ango Obiang, born on December 20, 1973 in Libreville in Gabon is a Gabonese writer. Her literary works include short stories, drama, romance, pictures, scripts and poetry.  Obiang has a university degree in Economics. She combines the two professions of being a writer and an economist.

Career 
She received her first prize at the age of 17 for her poem Rien tout nuit , during the 6th Komo poetic recital in Gabon on April 26, 1991.

In 1997, she won the Poetry Prize at Omar Bongo University while she was in her second year of pursuing her economics degree. In 2000, she won the special Jury Prize of the BICIG contest as a friend of the arts and letters, for her new novel L'amour dans deux visages. The same year, with her song Le chant des naufrages, she won the silver hibiscus poetry contest of the Union of Gabonese Writers (known in French as l'Union des Écrivains Gabonais (UDEG)). This turn of events led to her putting together a publication of a collection of poems which she published in 2001.

References 

1973 births
Living people
Gabonese writers
People from Libreville
Omar Bongo University alumni
21st-century Gabonese people